St. Peter's Umbrella (Hungarian: Szent Péter esernyöje) is a 1935 Hungarian drama film directed by Géza von Cziffra and starring Marica Gervai, Lajos Básti and Pál Kalmár. It was based on the 1895 novel St. Peter's Umbrella by Kálmán Mikszáth which had previously been adapted into a silent film in 1917.

Cast

External links

Hungarian drama films
Films directed by Géza von Cziffra
Films based on Hungarian novels
1935 drama films
Hungarian black-and-white films
1930s Hungarian-language films